The Phillips–Ronald House, also known as the Carrington Lybrook House and Five Chimneys, is a historic home located at Blacksburg, Montgomery County, Virginia.  It was built in 1851–1852, and is a one-story, brick dwelling with a hipped roof and double-pile, central-passage plan. It features a late-19th century, three-bay central entrance porch with sawn brackets and spindles in the gable and slender turned posts.  Also on the property is a contributing frame garage.

It was listed on the National Register of Historic Places in 1989.

References

Houses on the National Register of Historic Places in Virginia
Houses completed in 1852
Houses in Montgomery County, Virginia
Buildings and structures in Blacksburg, Virginia
National Register of Historic Places in Montgomery County, Virginia
1852 establishments in Virginia